Bussa, or Mossiya, is a Cushitic language spoken in the Dirashe special woreda of the Southern Nations, Nationalities, and People's Region located in southern Ethiopia. The people themselves, numbering 18,000 according to the 2007 census, call their language Mossittaata.

Blench (2006) reclassified Bussa from the Dullay to Konsoid branch of Cushitic, but left the Mashole, Lohu, and Dobase (D'oopace, D'opaasunte) dialects in Dullay as the Dobase language. He considers Mashile (Mashelle) to be a distinct language within Konsoid.

Bussa is highly influenced by surrounding Cushitic and Omotic languages and should be considered endangered according to Gurmu (2005). Speakers of the North Bussa variety are shifting to Oromo, Dirasha or Amharic, whereas speakers of the West Bussa variety are shifting to the Omotic languages Zargulla, Zayse and Gamo. Important factors for the ongoing language shift include intermarriage with other ethnic groups and heavy contact with neighbouring people.

References
Gurmu, Alemayehu [2005] 'Some Notes on Sociolinguistic Aspects of Bussa' (unpublished paper presented at International Conference on Endangered Ethiopian Languages, Addis Ababa 27–30 April 2005)
Wedekind, Klaus (ed.) (2002) 'Sociolinguistic survey report of the languages of the Gawwada (Dullay), Diraasha (Gidole), Muusiye (Bussa) areas.' SIL Electronic Survey Reports 2002-065.

External links

Languages of Ethiopia
East Cushitic languages
Endangered languages of Africa